Shadang Village is a town central area in Chenjiagang, Xiangshui County, Jiangsu, China.

On Mar 21, 2019, an explosion occurred in Tianjiayi Chemical. Shadang Village is about 1 km away from the plant. 
Buildings in Shadang Village were seriously affected by the blast wave. Shutter doors and windows were torn out of shape.
Residents were not evacuated as of 20:00 (UTC+8).

Administrative divisions 

See also 
 Chenjiagang Town
 2019 Xiangshui chemical plant explosion

References 

Chenjiagang
Villages in China